Viola is an unincorporated community in Heard County, in the U.S. state of Georgia.

History
A post office called Viola was established in 1889, and remained in operation until 1905. The community was named after one Viola Franklin.

References

Unincorporated communities in Georgia (U.S. state)
Unincorporated communities in Heard County, Georgia